Didier Garcia (born 23 May 1964) is a French former cyclist. He competed in the team pursuit and the points race events at the 1984 Summer Olympics.

References

External links
 

1964 births
Living people
French male cyclists
Olympic cyclists of France
Cyclists at the 1984 Summer Olympics
People from Le Blanc-Mesnil
French track cyclists
Sportspeople from Seine-Saint-Denis
Cyclists from Île-de-France